Borci Donji is a community in Kotor Varoš Municipality, Bosnia and Herzegovina.

Population

Census 1991

Note
The population census from 1971 and 1981 show the total population for the settlements Borci Donji and Borci Gornji.

See also
Kotor Varoš

References

External links 
 Zvanična stranica općine Kotor Varoš

Villages in Bosnia and Herzegovina
Kotor Varoš